The Fife Opera House is a theater in Palestine, Illinois, in Crawford County. It is on the National Register of Historic Places and has been since January 26, 1990.

History
Construction at the David Fife Opera House started in 1898 and finished in 1901. In the building David Fife operated a hardware store on the ground floor. Upon completion the opera house seated several hundred in a building that measured 55 X . The raked floor was filled with upholstered, red leather theater seats. Audiences were cooled by electric fans in summer and heat provided by a coal furnace kept them warm in cooler weather. The two original ceiling fixtures included a mirrored collar which reflected the glow of the high wattage light bulbs.

A handpainted rolled canvas fire curtain was hand painted by artists from Sosman and Landes, a Chicago company. The curtain art shows a Venetian canal scene. Side and top panels along the stage depict draperies surrounding a tree-lined river. Recently, other painted scenes showing gardens, waterfalls and a turn of the century scene have been discovered in the building. Fife's mother demanded that one of the building's five interior art panels, the one that featured cherubs, be painted over to cover their nakedness.

It is said the lights all over Palestine dimmed when Fife threw the switches to the lights at the opera house on opening night.

Notes

External links
Fife Opera House — Palestine Preservation Projects Society

Opera houses in Illinois
Buildings and structures in Crawford County, Illinois
National Register of Historic Places in Crawford County, Illinois
Theatres on the National Register of Historic Places in Illinois
Theatres completed in 1901
Music venues completed in 1901
Opera houses on the National Register of Historic Places
Event venues on the National Register of Historic Places in Illinois